Skalice u České Lípy is a municipality and village in Česká Lípa District in the Liberec Region of the Czech Republic. It has about 1,500 inhabitants.

Twin towns – sister cities

Skalice u České Lípy is twinned with:
 Bertsdorf-Hörnitz, Germany

References

Villages in Česká Lípa District